Cloudera, Inc. is an American software company providing enterprise data management systems that make significant use of Apache Hadoop. As of January 31, 2021, the company had approximately 1,800 customers.

History
Cloudera, Inc. was formed on June 27, 2008, by Christophe Bisciglia (from Google), Amr Awadallah (from Yahoo!), Jeff Hammerbacher (from Facebook), and Mike Olson (from Oracle).  Awadallah oversaw a business unit performing data analysis using Hadoop while at Yahoo!; Hammerbacher used Hadoop to develop some of Facebook's data analytics applications; and Olson formerly served as the CEO of Sleepycat Software, the company that created Berkeley DB. The four were joined in 2009 by Doug Cutting, a co-founder of Hadoop.
 
In March 2009, Cloudera released Cloudera Distribution for Hadoop (CDH), a commercial distribution of Hadoop, in conjunction with a $5 million investment led by Accel Partners. This was followed by a $25 million funding round in October 2010, a $40M funding round in November 2011, and a $160M funding round in March 2014.

In June 2013, Tom Reilly became chief executive officer of the company, although Olson remained as chairman of the board and chief strategist. Both left the company in June 2019. Rob Bearden was appointed as Cloudera's CEO in January 2020.

In March 2014, Intel invested $740 million in Cloudera for an 18% stake in the company. These shares were repurchased by Cloudera in December 2020 for $314 million.

On April 28, 2017, the company became a public company via an initial public offering. Over the next four years, the company's share price declined in the wake of falling sales figures and the rise of public cloud services like Amazon Web Services. In October 2018, Cloudera and Hortonworks announced their merger, which the two companies completed the following January. In October 2021, the company went private after an acquisition by KKR and Clayton, Dubilier & Rice in an all cash transaction valued at approximately $5.3 billion.
 
Cloudera has formed partnerships with companies such as Dell, IBM, and Oracle.

Products and services
Cloudera provides the Cloudera Data Platform, a collection of products related to cloud services and data processing. Some of these services are provided through public cloud servers such as Microsoft Azure or Amazon Web Services, while others are private cloud services that require a subscription. Cloudera markets these products for purposes related to machine learning and data analysis.

References

External links
 

 
 

American companies established in 2008
2008 establishments in California
2017 initial public offerings
2021 mergers and acquisitions
Business intelligence companies
Business intelligence software
Business analysis
Big data companies 
Cloud computing providers
Cloud infrastructure
Companies based in Palo Alto, California
Companies formerly listed on the New York Stock Exchange
Data companies
Data visualization software 
Hadoop
Software companies based in the San Francisco Bay Area
Software companies established in 2008
Software companies of the United States
Kohlberg Kravis Roberts companies
Private equity portfolio companies